= Melli Atsing Monastery =

Buddhist monastery in Sikkim, northeastern India

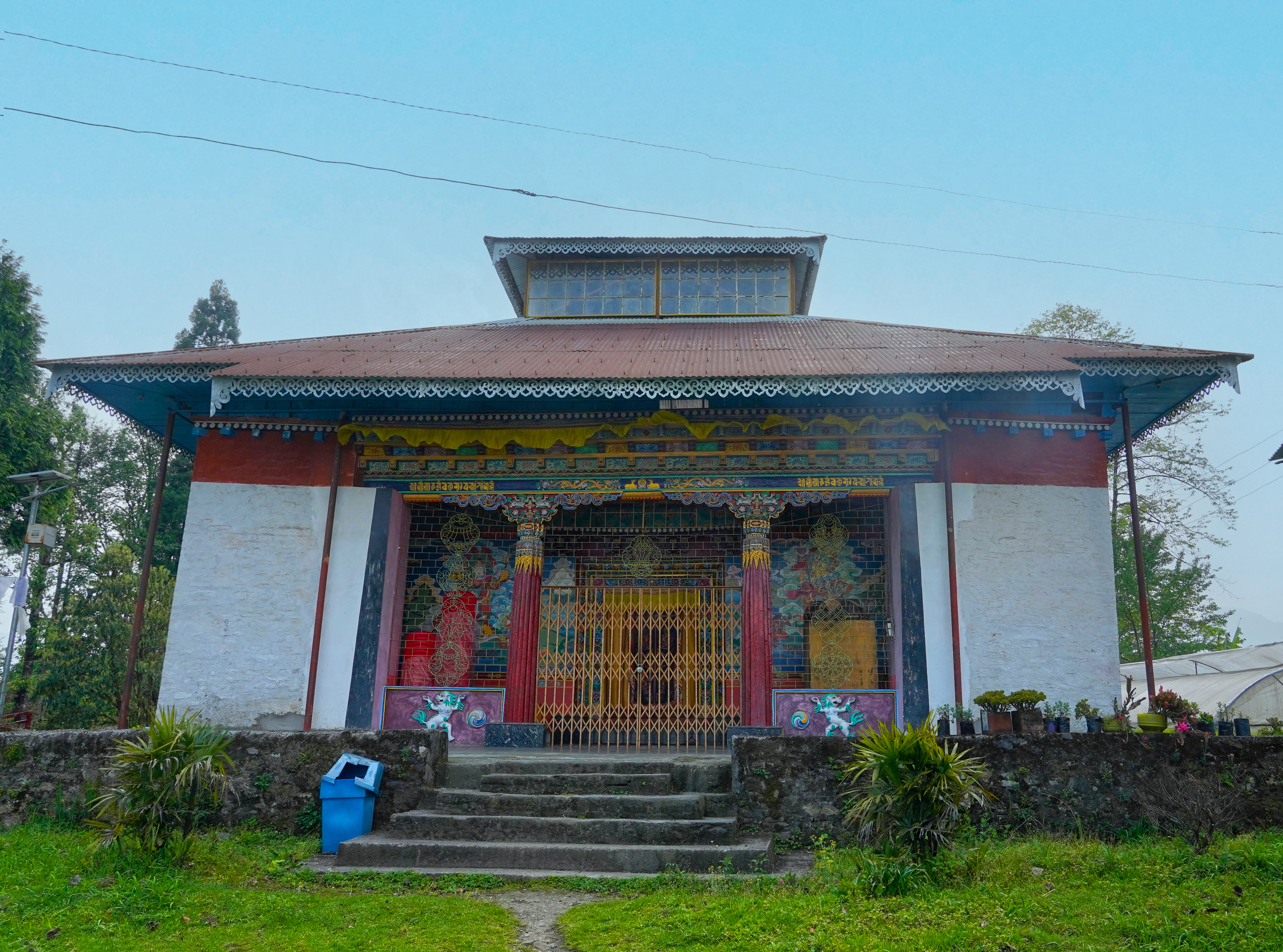
- Melli Atsing Monastery

- Location within India

Religion
- Affiliation: Tibetan Buddhism
- Sect: Nyingmapa

Location
- Location: Sikkim, India
- Country: India
- Interactive map of Melli Atsing Monastery
- Coordinates: 27°19′38″N 88°12′25″E

Architecture
- Founder: Lama Dudjom Yeshey Nyingpo
- Established: 1740; 286 years ago

Melli Atsing Monastery (a.k.a. Mallu Monastery) is a Buddhist monastery in Sikkim, northeastern India.
